Nazi Boni (December 31, 1909, in Bwan, Upper Senegal and Niger – May 16, 1969, in Kokologho, Upper Volta) was a politician from Upper Volta (now Burkina Faso). In 1948 Boni was elected to the French National Assembly on behalf of the Voltaic Union (UV), and was re-elected in 1951 running on the Economic and Social Action in the Interests of Upper Volta list, although he remained a UV member. In 1955 Boni founded the African Popular Movement (MPA) after a split from the UV. In January 1957, Boni's MPA took part in the founding of the African Convention, a pan-African party that later merged into the African Regroupment Party.

From December 1957 to February 1958 Boni served as President of the Territorial Assembly. In 1959 he founded a new party, the Republican Party for Liberty, in opposition to the attempts to make Upper Volta a one-party state under the Voltaic Democratic Union. Boni was forced into exile in Dakar, Senegal.

In 1962, Boni wrote a novel, Le Crépuscule des temps anciens (The Twilight of the Bygone Days), which explored the precolonial existence of the Bwa people and the Volta-Bani War.

References
 
 page on the French National Assembly website

1909 births
1969 deaths
People from Boucle du Mouhoun Region
People of French West Africa
Burkinabé politicians
Deputies of the 1st National Assembly of the French Fourth Republic
Deputies of the 2nd National Assembly of the French Fourth Republic
Deputies of the 3rd National Assembly of the French Fourth Republic
Deputies of the 1st National Assembly of the French Fifth Republic
Burkinabé novelists
Burkinabé expatriates in Senegal
20th-century novelists
20th-century Burkinabé people